Gymnastics events were competed at the 2005 East Asian Games in Macau.

Medal winners

Men

Women

2005 East Asian Games
2005
East Asian Games
Artistic gymnastics competitions